97.5 Brigada News FM (DXZC 97.5 MHz) is an FM station owned and operated by Brigada Mass Media Corporation. Its studios and transmitter are located at Ground Floor, Aspilla Bldg., Quirino Dr., Kidapawan.

References

External links
Brigada News FM Kidapawan FB Page
Brigada News FM Kidapawan Website

Radio stations in Cotabato
Radio stations established in 2015